Çakırhüyük is a town (belde) and municipality in the Besni District, Adıyaman Province, Turkey. Its population is 2,210 (2021).

The settlements of Abımıstık, Boybeypınarı, Köprübaşı, Levzin and Yeşilova are attached to the town. Abımıstık and Levzin are populated by Kurds of the Reşwan tribe.

References

Towns in Turkey
Populated places in Adıyaman Province
Besni District

Kurdish settlements in Adıyaman Province